Virginia Ohagwu is a Paralympian athlete from Nigeria. She represents Nigeria in shot put - seated category. She has won 2 silver medals at the Commonwealth games held in 2002 and 2006.

Achievements 
Ohagwu competed in the 2002 Commonwealth Games in Manchester, England where she won a silver medal after representing Nigeria in the Women's Shot put - Seated event with a result of 8.76m.

She also won a silver medal after having participated also in Women's Seated Shot Put event at the 2006 Commonwealth Games held in Melbourne.

References 

Nigerian sportspeople
Year of birth missing (living people)
Living people
Commonwealth Games silver medallists for Nigeria
Commonwealth Games medallists in athletics
Athletes (track and field) at the 2002 Commonwealth Games
Athletes (track and field) at the 2006 Commonwealth Games
Paralympic athletes of Nigeria
Medallists at the 2006 Commonwealth Games